Wrap advertising or a vehicle wrap is known as the marketing practice of completely or partially covering (wrapping) a vehicle in a vinyl material, which may be for a color change, advertising or custom delivery. The result of this process is essentially a mobile billboard. Wrap advertising can be achieved by painting a vehicle's outer surface, but an increasingly ubiquitous practice in the 21st century involves the use of large vinyl sheets as "decals". The vinyl sheets can later be removed with relative ease, drastically reducing the costs associated with changing advertisements. While vehicles with large, flat surfaces (such as buses and light-rail carriages) are often used, automobiles can also serve as hosts for wrap advertising, despite consisting of more curved surfaces.  Wrap advertising is also used in the magazine and publishing industries.

History
Until the age of the automobile, train companies were the largest industry to paint company names and logos for distinction on their locomotives and railcars.

The first attempts at using the plastic in commercial applications failed as a result of being too fragile. In 1926, Waldo Semon invented the vinyl still used today by introducing additives to PVC that made it flexible and easier to process. 

The world’s first total bus wrap was produced in 1991 by Contra Vision in New Zealand for the Pan Pacific Hotel. The bus was converted into a mobile billboard which still allowed passengers inside to see out. The glass was covered with see-through graphics (one-way vision window graphics) using a clear PET window film which was part screen printed and part spray painted. The bodywork was directly spray painted.

A large milestone in the shift from small production vinyl lettering to a full vehicle vinyl color change took place in Germany in 1993 when the vinyl manufacturer Kay Premium Marking Films (KPMF) was asked to produce a film to be used in place of paint for the purpose of converting cars into taxis. At this time, German taxi companies were required by law to paint their fleets in a government mandated color, beige. KMPF provided an alternative to painting, which allowed taxi companies to bring a large fleet of vehicles into compliance with German law while maintaining the future resale value of the vehicle. Prior to this point, decommissioned taxis were heavily discounted or had to be completely repainted. With the use of vinyl vehicle wraps there was no need to repaint them or discount them as the vinyl could be removed without damaging the paint underneath. KPMF documented after 3 years of taxi service was complete, the vinyl was removed leaving a pristine and unscratched paint surface. 

The first world’s first digitally printed vehicle wrap is thought to have been created for Pepsi Co in 1993, which used vinyl to wrap a bus promoting its Crystal Pepsi product. It wasn’t long before bus wrap advertising was everywhere and the new form of vehicle graphics trickled down to smaller businesses and consumers. Wrapping whole vehicles was still challenging. Majority of the difficulties came from premature adhesion and air bubbles under the vinyl. As technology improved, companies like Avery Dennison, 3M and Oracal developed the use of air-channels that made the vinyl repositionable and allowed for bubble-free installation. Air-channel, created using microscopic glass beads incorporated into the vinyl’s adhesive, prevented the vinyl from fully sticking to the substrates surface thereby permitting air flow between adjacent sections. In addition, these beads allow for the vinyl to be repeatedly removed and reapplied until the beads are broken by firmly pressing the vinyl using a small hard squeegee. Once the beads are broken the vinyl will be firmly adhered to the substrates surface. Proprietary company blends of polymer in the vinyl allowed the material to conform to compound curves, recesses, and corrugations through the use of heat guns and torches.

Description

Advancements in plastics have led to new types of vinyl designed specifically for wrap advertising, including vinyl sheets that feature bubble-preventing air channels. Microscopic glass beads are used to prevent an adhesive from functioning until the user is ready (the beads allow the material to be repeatedly lifted and reapplied during the wrapping process, without compromising the longevity of the wrap). The vinyl is heated with a heat gun or torch for the purpose of molding the material around objects.

Decals can be made to cover side and rear windows on a vehicle, but for safety reasons, the front windows used by the driver are not covered. The decals on side windows are typically perforated, so that it is still possible for passengers to look outside. This See-through graphic technology originated in the 1980s, with the first dominant patent registered by a British company called Contra Vision.

Cast vinyl 
The term "cast" refers to the manufacturing process of this type of vinyl. Cast films are considered the industry premium. These films start in a liquid state with the ingredients blended together and then poured onto a casting sheet. The casting process produces a thin gauge film—usually 1- to 2-mil thick. By casting film on a sheet, the film stays in a more relaxed state, resulting in a durable, flexible, conformable and dimensionally stable film that retains color well. These films are ideal for complex surfaces such as vehicles and where a smooth finished look is expected.

Calendered vinyl 
Calendered vinyl film or sheeting is manufactured by mixing powdered PVC, liquid softener and coloring agent into a molten dough-like mixture. The mixture is then extruded through a die and pressed into an increasingly thin sheet using a series of hard pressure rollers, called calendering rolls. When the material reaches the rollers, it passes through a series of decreasing gaps, which in turn increases the temperature and uniformity of the mixture. After each pass, the film becomes thinner and wider until the material is formed into a thin sheet of vinyl. The vinyl is then cooled, wound, and later coated with adhesive.

Legality
A number of municipalities have introduced strict laws in order to mandate against mobile advertisements; this has partially been due to the fact that wrap advertisements are purposefully circulated throughout high-density areas. New York City is a notable example, where any sort of motorized advertisement is outlawed. Mobile billboards have been identified as a contributing factor in the city's already-problematic traffic congestion.

Other kinds of vinyl wrap

Color change wraps 
These wraps are similar in that a vinyl (although a cast vinyl sheet) is used to cover parts or whole vehicles in a new color or in a protective form of a color matching vinyl that may match an OEM paint color or may be a brand new color entirely.

Many consumers are able to change the color of their vehicle to something that may not be available or even possible with paint. This may require disclosure to both the vehicle insurer and local vehicle authority, such as the DVLA in the UK.

Paint protection films 
Paint protection films (PPF) are clear and OEM paint color match vinyl films designed to protect paint. Clear PPF allows the original paint color to show through the protective vinyl and color matching vinyl films replicate the OEM color with a protective vinyl.

See also

Bus advertising
Vehicle vinyl wrap
Driven media
Fleet media
Mobile billboard
Out-of-home advertising
Truckside advertisement

References

Advertising tools
Advertising techniques
Advertising by medium
Public transport